St. Mary's Colgan High School is a parochial, Roman Catholic high school in Pittsburg, Kansas in the Roman Catholic Diocese of Wichita. It is under the direction of Our Lady of Lourdes Catholic Parish.

Athletic activities
St. Mary's Colgan provides a wide variety of athletic programs. Athletic teams are known as the "Panthers" and classified as a 2A school according to the KSHSAA.

Football 
One of the most successful sports programs at St. Mary's Colgan is the football team, which has won seven state championships and has produced several collegiate athletes. From 1974 to 2003, the St. Mary's Colgan football team has had seven undefeated seasons. Additionally, the team won 66 consecutive games from 2001 to 2004. The football team competes on Hutchinson Field which it shares with other local schools as allowed by the Pittsburg Community Schools. The current Head Coach is Shawn Seematter.

Baseball 
Baseball has been the most successful program during the history of St. Mary's Colgan. Throughout its history, the Panther baseball team has won 16 state championships and has produced a few collegiate athletes, similar to the football program. The Panther baseball team made a total of 30 championship game appearances from 1964 to 2011. Gary Schiefelbein set the school record of stolen bases in a season with 45 in 1992.
Colgan went on a 7-peat state championship winning streak from 2004 to 2010. The current Head Coach is Mike Watt.

State championships

St. Mary's Colgan High School offers the following sports:

Fall
 Football
 Volleyball
 Boys Cross-Country
 Girls Cross-Country
 Girls Golf
 Boys Soccer
 Girls Tennis
 Fall Cheerleading

Winter
 Boys Basketball
 Girls Basketball
 Winter Cheerleading

Spring
 Baseball
 Boys Golf
 Softball
 Boys Track and Field
 Girls Track and Field

Notable alumni
 Barry Dean, country/pop/rock songwriter who has co-written such as Girls Chase Boys sung by Ingrid Michaelson
 P.J. Forbes (1984), former MLB player

Gallery

See also

 List of high schools in Kansas
 List of unified school districts in Kansas

References

External links
 

Roman Catholic Diocese of Wichita
Catholic secondary schools in Kansas
Schools in Crawford County, Kansas
Education in Pittsburg, Kansas